Timothy Patrick Bowes-Lyon, 16th and 3rd Earl of Strathmore and Kinghorne (18 March 1918 – 13 September 1972),  was a British nobleman and peer. He was the second son of The 15th Earl of Strathmore and Kinghorne and the nephew of Elizabeth Bowes-Lyon, wife of King George VI. He was a cousin of Queen Elizabeth II and Princess Margaret.

After the death of his older brother in 1941 in World War II, he was styled Lord Glamis. On 25 May 1949, he succeeded his father Patrick as Earl of Strathmore and Kinghorne.

Strathmore married an Irish nurse and commoner, Mary Bridget Brennan, who predeceased him, (ca. 1923 – 8 September 1967) at Glamis Castle on 18 June 1958. They had one daughter, Lady Caroline Frances Bowes-Lyon (8 December 1959 – 1 January 1960), who died at less than one month of age.

Death
Upon his death on 13 September 1972, as he had no son, he was succeeded by his first cousin Michael Bowes-Lyon.

References

1918 births
1972 deaths
Timothy Bowes-Lyon, 16th Earl of Strathmore and Kinghorne
16
People from County Durham
Earls in the Peerage of the United Kingdom